Emilio Villari (25 September 1836 – 20 August 1904) was an Italian experimental physicist and a professor at the University of Bologna and later Naples who contributed to studies on electromagnetism after whom is named the Villari Effect. He also developed a quadrant electrometer. 

Villari came from a wealthy family, his father was a lawyer and a younger sibling was Pasquale Villari. Suffering from epileptic seizures from an early age he was privately educated in Naples including in literature under Leopoldo Rodino, math under Achille Sannia and physics from Luigi Palmieri. He then went to the University of Pisa where his brother Pasquale taught. He studied medicine but was influenced by Riccardo Felici and he later studied physics. He spent some time in Germany in the laboratory of Gustav Magnus before joining the University of Bologna in 1871 as professor of physics. In 1900 he moved to Naples to succeed Gilberto Govi. In 1873 he examined why alternating current causes greater heat generation in metals than direct current. Villari suggested that this was due to the existence of molecular magnets and their resistance to induced electromagnetism and differed in his theory from that of Maxwell and Kelvin. He examined the expansion of ferromagnetic materials under electromagnetism and discovered the reverse effect as well which is sometimes known as the Villari Effect. The Villari effect is put into application in strain sensors in a wide range of engineering situations.  Adolfo Bartoli worked on radiation thermodynamics with Villari in Bologna for some time. Mario Pieri was also a student. Villari received the Matteucci Medal for 1884.

References 

1836 births
1904 deaths
Italian physicists